Mazraeh Mashhadi (also Romanized as Mazra‘eh Mashhadī) is a village in Zefreh Rural District, Kuhpayeh District, Isfahan County, Isfahan Province, Iran. At the 2006 census, its population was 51, in 17 families.

References 

Populated places in Isfahan County